Little Red Lies is a 2013 young adult novel by Canadian author Julie Johnston. The coming of age novel is set immediately after World War II in a small Canadian town.

Plot summary
Rachel McLaren as she navigates her relationships with her brother Jamie, her inappropriate high school drama teacher, her parents, and others.

Reception
Reviews of Little Red Lies have been mostly positive with starred reviews from Kirkus Reviews, and Booklist.

Voice of Youth Advocates was impressed, writing ".. the plethora of plot threads could turn into bathos but Johnston weaves them into a believable, engaging story.",, and School Library Journal found it "A quiet, thoughtful novel, with more introspection than action.".

Little Red Lies has also been reviewed by Publishers Weekly, The Horn Book Magazine, The Bulletin of the Center for Children's Books, and the Historical Novels Review.

References

2013 Canadian novels
Canadian young adult novels
Canadian historical novels
Children's historical novels
Novels set in Canada
McClelland & Stewart books